William James Wallace (April 14, 1837 – March 11, 1917) was a United States circuit judge of the United States Court of Appeals for the Second Circuit and of the United States Circuit Courts for the Second Circuit and previously was a United States district judge of the United States District Court for the Northern District of New York.

Education and career

Born on April 14, 1837, in Syracuse, New York, Wallace attended Syracuse University and received a Bachelor of Laws in 1857 from the law department of Hamilton College, then read law in 1858. He entered private practice in Syracuse from 1859 to 1874. He was the Mayor of Syracuse from 1873 to 1874.

Federal judicial service

Wallace was nominated by President Ulysses S. Grant on April 2, 1874, to a seat on the United States District Court for the Northern District of New York vacated by Judge Nathan K. Hall. He was confirmed by the United States Senate on April 7, 1874, and received his commission the same day. His service terminated on April 25, 1882, due to his elevation to the Second Circuit.

Wallace was nominated by President Chester A. Arthur on March 28, 1882, to a seat on the United States Circuit Courts for the Second Circuit vacated by Judge Samuel Blatchford. He was confirmed by the United States Senate on April 6, 1882, and received his commission the same day. Wallace was assigned by operation of law to additional and concurrent service on the United States Court of Appeals for the Second Circuit on June 16, 1891, to a new seat authorized by 26 Stat. 826 (Evarts Act). His service terminated on May 8, 1907, due to his retirement.

Later career and death

Following his retirement from the federal bench, Wallace resumed private practice in Syracuse from 1907 to 1917. He died on March 11, 1917, in Jacksonville, Florida.

References

Sources
 
 

1837 births
1917 deaths
19th-century American judges
Hamilton College (New York) alumni
Judges of the United States circuit courts
Judges of the United States Court of Appeals for the Second Circuit
Judges of the United States District Court for the Northern District of New York
Mayors of Syracuse, New York
United States federal judges appointed by Chester A. Arthur
United States federal judges appointed by Ulysses S. Grant